Pityrodia loricata is a flowering plant in the mint family Lamiaceae and is endemic to Australia. It is a dense, greyish, multi-stemmed shrub with whorled leaves, prominent sepals and pale, pinkish-white flowers. It is common in Western Australia and the Northern Territory and there is a single record from South Australia.

Description

The sepals are scaly on the outside of the tube and on the lobes but the inside of the sepal tube is glabrous. The petals are joined to form a tube with five lobes in two "lips", the lower lip having three lobes. Flowering occurs from May to November and is followed by hairy, oval-shaped fruit with the sepals still attached.

Taxonomy and naming
This species was first formally described in 1876 by Ferdinand von Mueller who gave it the name Chloanthes loricata and published the description in Fragmenta phytographiae Australiae. In 1904 Georg Pritzel changed the name to Pityrodia loricata. The specific epithet (loricata) is a Latin word meaning "clad in mail".

Distribution and habitat
This pityrodia grows in red or yellow sand on sand dunes. It is found in the near Lake Carnegie, Coolgardie and Eucla districts in Western Australia, near Mount Sonder in the MacDonnell Ranges in the Northern Territory and there is a single record from Mamungari Conservation Park in South Australia.

Conservation
Pityrodia loricata is classified as "not threatened" by the Western Australian Government Department of Parks and Wildlife.

References

 

loricata
Plants described in 1876
Flora of South Australia
Flora of the Northern Territory
Flora of Western Australia
Taxa named by Ferdinand von Mueller